The knee-joint dart (Feltia geniculata) is a moth of the family Noctuidae. It is found in Ontario, Quebec, New Brunswick, Nova Scotia, Prince Edward Island and Manitoba and adjacent parts of the United States, including Massachusetts.

The wingspan is 29–34 mm. Adults are on wing from July to mid-September.

The larvae feed on a wide variety of plants.

External links
Bug Guide
Images
Species info

Noctuinae
Moths of North America